Duke Elegant is a 1999 studio album by New Orleans keyboard player and vocalist Dr. John. The album was produced by the artist under his real name, Mac Rebennack, and is a collection of songs written or performed by Duke Ellington.  It features musical support from "The Lower 9-11" (David Barard,  Bobby Broom, and Herman "Roscoe" Ernest III), Ronnie Cuber, and Cyro Baptista.

Track listing
The year each song was originally written is given with the composers' names.
"On The Wrong Side of the Railroad Tracks" (1947; John Latouche, Duke Ellington) - 5:41
"I'm Gonna Go Fishin'" (1959; Duke Ellington, Peggy Lee) - 5:02
"It Don't Mean a Thing (If It Ain't Got That Swing)" (1932; Duke Ellington, Irving Mills) - 5:30
"Perdido" (1942; Ervin M. Drake, Hans Longsfolder, Juan Tizol) - 5:48
"Don't Get Around Much Anymore" (1942; Bob Russell, Duke Ellington) - 3:35
"Solitude" (1934; Duke Ellington, Eddie DeLango, Irving Mills) - 5:03
"Satin Doll" (1953; Billy Strayhorn, Johnny Mercer, Duke Ellington) - 4:44
"Mood Indigo" (1931; Irving Mills, Duke Ellington, Barnard Bigard) - 6:52
"Do Nothing 'Til You Hear From Me" (1943; Bob Russell, Duke Ellington) - 5:29
"Things Ain't What They Used To Be" (1942; Mercer Ellington) - 6:23
"Caravan" (1937; Juan Tizol, Irving Mills, Duke Ellington) - 6:22
"Flaming Sword" (1940; Duke Ellington) - 5:45

Personnel
 Dr. John – piano, B3 organ, vocals
 Ronnie Cuber – saxophone
 Bobby Broom – guitar, backing vocals
 David Barard – bass, backing vocals
 Herman "Roscoe" Ernest III – drums, backing vocals
 Cyro Baptista – percussion

References

Dr. John albums
1999 albums
Parlophone albums
Duke Ellington tribute albums